Adhiyar (English: The Darkness) is a 2003 Bangladeshi film starring Raisul Islam Asad, Champa and Pijush Banerjee in lead roles. Selim Al Din bagged National Film Awards for Best Story.

Awards 
Bangladesh National Film Awards
Best Story - Selim Al Din

References

2003 films
Bengali-language Bangladeshi films
Films scored by Alauddin Ali
2000s Bengali-language films
 
Best Film Bachsas Award winners